Rīga dimd is the title of a traditional Latvian folk song that is best known as a musical composition by Jānis Cimze. Cimze's first composition of the song is from 1872, and the composition was performed 1873 at the I All-Latvian Singing Festival by a male choir. The tower bell music of the Saint Peter's Church in Riga, Latvia, plays Rīga dimd five times a day.

Lyrics

References

External links 
Rīga dimd score

Latvian folk songs
1872 compositions